C/2023 A3 (Tsuchinshan–ATLAS) is a comet from the Oort cloud discovered by ATLAS South Africa on 22 February 2023 and independently found in images by the Purple Mountain Observatory taken on 9 January 2023. , the comet is currently  from the Sun, approaching at 15.7 km/s, with an uncertainty region of ±200,000 km.

Observational history 
After the first orbit calculations it was noticed that it is the same as an 18.7 magnitude object reported to the Minor Planet Center by the Purple Mountain Observatory that was detected in images taken on 9 January 2023. It was entered in the objects waiting confirmation list but after no follow up observations were reported, it was removed in 30 January 2023 and was considered lost. Based on the naming conventions of comets, the comet received the name of both observatories.

The object was subsequently detected in images taken by Zwicky Transient Facility (ZTF) in Palomar Observatory on 22 December 2022, when it had a magnitude of 19.2-19.6. These images also revealed it had a very condensed coma and a small straight tail 10" in length, indicating it is a comet. More evidence of cometary activity were reported by Hidetaka Sato, M. Mattiazzo, and Cristóvão Jacques.

Upon discovery announcement the comet was estimated to reach a total magnitude of +3 during perihelion, assuming an absolute magnitude (H) of 7 and 2.5n = 8, when it will be in low solar elongation. It will become better visible from Earth about three weeks after perihelion, after mid October, when it is estimated to be of fourth magnitude. Gideon van Buitenen estimated that the comet will reach a magnitude of 0.9 during perihelion and -0.2 at the time of the closest approach to Earth, assuming H = 5.2 and 2.5n = 10, and without taking into consideration the effects of forward scattering. On 9 October 2024 the comet will be 3.5 degrees from the Sun.

Orbit 
The comet has a retrograde orbit, lying at an inclination of 139°. Τhe comet has its perihelion at a distance of 0.391 AU and the closest approach to Earth will be around 12 October 2024, at a distance of 0.47 AU. The comet doesn't approach close to the giant planets of the solar system. Its orbit is weakly hyperbolic before entering the planetary region of the Solar System. Due to planetary perturbations, the outbound orbit will have a greater eccentricity than the inbound orbit.

References

External links 
 

20230109
Comets in 2023
Non-periodic comets